Temur Partsvania (born 6 July 1991) is a Ukrainian football defender. He got Ukrainian citizenship in 2007.

Career

Desna Chernihiv
In February 2019 Partsvania moved from Kisvárda to Desna Chernihiv, the main club in Chernihiv, here he played 10 games.

Zhetysu
In July 2021 Partsvania moved to Zhetysu.

Istiklol
On 31 March 2022, Istiklol confirmed the signing of Partsvania.

Career statistics

Club

Honours
Istiklol
 Tajikistan Higher League (1):2022

Ukraine U19
 UEFA European Under-19 Championship: 2009

References

External links
 
 

1991 births
Living people
Ukrainian footballers
Ukraine youth international footballers
Ukraine under-21 international footballers
Footballers from Tbilisi
Association football defenders
Footballers from Georgia (country) 
Georgian emigrants to Ukraine
Naturalized citizens of Ukraine
Ukrainian expatriate footballers
Expatriate footballers in Hungary
Ukrainian expatriate sportspeople in Hungary
Expatriate footballers in Kazakhstan
Ukrainian expatriate sportspeople in Kazakhstan
FC Dynamo Kyiv players
FC Dynamo-2 Kyiv players
FC Metalurh Zaporizhzhia players
FC Volyn Lutsk players
Ukrainian Premier League players
FC Olimpik Donetsk players
FC Desna Chernihiv players
Kisvárda FC players
Nemzeti Bajnokság I players
MFC Mykolaiv players
FC Zhetysu players
Kazakhstan Premier League players